= WJND-LP =

- Ocala, Florida; United States
- Broadcast area: Ocala, Florida
- Frequency: 100.7 MHz
- Branding: MegaMix 100.7

Programming
- Format: Dance

Ownership
- Owner: Primeria Inglesia Bautista Hispanic Association

Technical information
- Licensing authority: FCC
- Class: L1
- ERP: 93 Watts

Links
- Public license information: LMS

WJND-LP (100.7 FM, "MegaMix 100.7") is a low-power non-commercial radio station in Ocala, Florida. Its format is primarily Dance music, with occasional Spanish language and Christian music programming.

The station is a one-man operation, as its Program Director and DJ, James Dispoto, aka "DJ New York", runs the station from his parents' home in Ocala. FCC regulations limit non-commercial radio certificates to educational or non-profit entities; the operating certificate is actually held by Primeria Inglesia Bautista Hispanic Association, a group in the Ocala area.

The station's location and broadcasting tower were a source of conflict between Marion County officials and Dispoto's family. The county shut down the station in the fall of 2003, citing zoning laws that prohibited the operation of a radio station in a residential neighborhood and restricted the height of any towers to 50 feet; the tower was approximately 100 feet tall. An engineer working with the Dispotos noted that James Dispoto's mother, Elaine, possesses an amateur radio operator license, and that the Federal Communications Commission requires communities to reasonably accommodate amateur radio operators. The county's response was that the station failed to secure a permit to construct the tower, and in any case, the tower was higher than required for amateur use.

In November 2004, the Marion County Commission agreed to let the station continue operating from the Dispoto home as long as the transmitter was moved out of the neighborhood. A compromise was reached in which the transmitter would be moved a short distance away, to an existing tower at a landfill owned by the county.
